Sundbusserne is a shipping line which only carries pedestrian passengers on the HH Ferry route between Elsinore (Danish: Helsingør), at north-east Zealand, Denmark and Helsingborg, Scania, Sweden.

They started under Norwegian flag in 1958, and during the time between the 1960s and the first decade of the second millennium they departed every 15th or 20th minute from each harbour. Owner until 2007 was A/S Moltzau.

In 2007 the shipping line was sold and renamed to "ACE-link". After a failed investment in two little larger ships they fell into bankruptcy. But soon afterwards the line was restarted again with one of their older ships, M/F Pernille.

Since 2010, with just one ship, they depart every hour instead.

References

Ferry companies of Denmark
Helsingør
Transport in Helsingborg